Bryndza Podhalańska is a Polish variety of the soft cheese Bryndza, from the Podhale region, it is made from sheep's milk.

It has a geographical indication under EU law, with PDO status.

References

See also
 Bryndza Podhalańska in Poland Language

Sheep's-milk cheeses
Polish cheeses
Cheeses with designation of origin protected in the European Union
Polish products with protected designation of origin